Limborelia innesi, also known as the compact palmleaf snail, is a species of palmleaf snail that is endemic to Australia's Lord Howe Island in the Tasman Sea.

Description
The turbinate to conical shell of adult snails is 3.6–3.9 mm in height, with a diameter of 2.5–2.8 mm. It is smooth, dark brown to black in colour, with a pointed spire. The animal's body and cephalic tentacles are black.

Habitat
The snail is found on the southern mountains of the island, in rainforest and moist woodland, living on rock faces above an elevation of 400 m.

References

External links
 Iredale, T. (1944). The land Mollusca of Lord Howe Island. The Australian Zoologist. 10(3): 299-334

 
innesi
Gastropods of Lord Howe Island
Taxa named by Tom Iredale
Gastropods described in 1944